A mattucashlass is a type of dagger worn concealed in the armpit and primarily used for close combat, part of traditional Scottish male Highland dress. It is also referred to as an armpit dagger or a sleeve dagger in English. In Scots, the alternative name skene-ochil or skene-occles can also be found.

Etymology

See also

References

Scottish clothing
Daggers
Ceremonial knives
Blade weapons
Weapons of Scotland
Scottish Gaelic language